Ravilious is a surname. Notable people with the surname include:

Eric Ravilious (1903–1942), British painter, designer, book illustrator and wood-engraver
James Ravilious (1939–1999), British photographer; son of Eric
Tirzah Ravilious (1908-1951; née Garwood), British artist; wife of Eric